In quantum mechanics, the probability current (sometimes called probability flux) is a mathematical quantity describing the flow of probability. Specifically, if one thinks of probability as a heterogeneous fluid, then the probability current is the rate of flow of this fluid. It is a real vector that changes with space and time. Probability currents are analogous to mass currents in hydrodynamics and electric currents in electromagnetism. As in those fields, the probability current is related to the probability density function via a continuity equation. The probability current is invariant under gauge transformation.

The concept of probability current is also used outside of quantum mechanics, when dealing with probability density functions that change over time, for instance in Brownian motion and the Fokker–Planck equation.

Definition (non-relativistic 3-current)

Free spin-0 particle 

In non-relativistic quantum mechanics, the probability current  of the wave function  of a particle of mass  in one dimension is defined as

where  
 denotes the complex conjugate of the wave function;
 denotes the real part;
 denotes the imaginary part. 
Note that the probability current is proportional to a Wronskian 

In three dimensions, this generalizes to

where 
 is the reduced Planck constant;
 is the particle's mass;
 is the wavefunction;
 denotes the del or gradient operator.

This can be simplified in terms of the kinetic momentum operator,

to obtain

These definitions use the position basis (i.e. for a wavefunction in position space), but momentum space is possible.

Spin-0 particle in an electromagnetic field 

The above definition should be modified for a system in an external electromagnetic field. In SI units, a charged particle of mass  and electric charge  includes a term due to the interaction with the electromagnetic field;

where  is the magnetic potential (aka "-field"). The term  has dimensions of momentum. Note that  used here is the canonical momentum and is not gauge invariant, unlike the kinetic momentum operator .

In Gaussian units:

where  is the speed of light.

Spin-s particle in an electromagnetic field 

If the particle has spin, it has a corresponding magnetic moment, so an extra term needs to be added incorporating the spin interaction with the electromagnetic field. In SI units:

where  is the spin vector of the particle with corresponding spin magnetic moment  and spin quantum number .  In Gaussian units:

Connection with classical mechanics 

The wave function can also be written in the complex exponential (polar) form:

The exponentials and  terms cancel:

If we take the familiar formula for the mass flux in hydrodynamics:

This interpretation fits with Hamilton–Jacobi theory, in which

Motivation

Continuity equation for quantum mechanics 

The definition of probability current and Schrödinger's equation can be used to derive the continuity equation, which has exactly the same forms as those for hydrodynamics and electromagnetism:

where the probability density  is defined as

If one were to integrate both sides of the continuity equation with respect to volume, so that

then the divergence theorem implies the continuity equation is equivalent to the integral equation

This is the conservation law for probability in quantum mechanics.

In particular, if  is a wavefunction describing a single particle, the integral in the first term of the preceding equation, sans time derivative, is the probability of obtaining a value within  when the position of the particle is measured. The second term is then the rate at which probability is flowing out of the volume .

Transmission and reflection through potentials 

Both satisfy:

where  and  can be defined by:

where  are the incident, reflected and transmitted probability currents respectively, and the vertical bars indicate the magnitudes of the current vectors.

In terms of a unit vector  normal to the barrier, these are equivalently:

where the absolute values are required to prevent  and  being negative.

Examples

Plane wave 

For a plane wave propagating in space:

the probability density is constant everywhere;

(that is, plane waves are stationary states) but the probability current is nonzero – the square of the absolute amplitude of the wave times the particle's speed;

illustrating that the particle may be in motion even if its spatial probability density has no explicit time dependence.

Particle in a box 

For a particle in a box, in one spatial dimension and of length , confined to the region , the energy eigenstates are

and zero elsewhere. The associated probability currents are

since

Discrete definition 

As a result, we find:

References

Further reading 

Quantum mechanics